Berikon is a municipality in the district of Bremgarten in the canton of Aargau in Switzerland.

The village lies on a hill above and to the east of the Reuss Valley, covering part of the Mutschellen Pass. This municipality is bounded by Rudolfstetten-Friedlisberg, Widen, Zufikon, and Oberwil-Lieli, all in canton Aargau, and shares a boundary with the canton of Zurich (district of Dietikon) to the east.

History

Berikon was mentioned for the first time in 1153 as a court place "Berchheim".  In 1184 it was mentioned as Berchein.  Over time, the name of the place changed from Berchheim to  Bergheim, then to Berchan, Berkein, and finally Berikon.

The originally separate settlements Unterberikon (Lower Berikon) and Oberberikon (Upper Berikon) fell under the territorial lordship of the city of Zurich in 1415, when the Eidgenossen (Confederacy) conquered Aargau. Later, in 1471, Unterberikon became part of Amt Rohrdorf in the county of Baden, while Oberberikon fell under the oversight of the Kelleramt (Freiamt Affoltern).

When in 1798 the French overran Switzerland and instituted the Helvetic Republic, both municipalities came to the short-lived canton of Baden.  During the establishment of the canton of Aargau in 1803, the two municipalities were reunited and joined the district of Bremgarten.

On 1 May 1902, the Bremgarten-Dietikon-Bahn was opened, giving Berikon a railway connection to the rest of Switzerland.  Still, until well into the 20th century, Berikon was a rural village, populated by just 900 inhabitants in 1950, before  a sudden boom of construction activity occurred.  Within thirty years the total population increased by over 150%. Today's population is roughly quadruple that of the 1960s.  Berikon has grown together with the neighbouring municipalities and is today part of the agglomeration of Zurich.

Geography
Of this area, 49.7% is used for agricultural purposes, while 31.4% is forested. The rest of the land, (18.9%) is settled.

The municipality is located in the Bremgarten district, and is located on the Mutschellenhöhe.  It consists of the originally separate villages of Ober- and Unter-Berikon.

Coat of arms
The blazon of the municipal coat of arms is Argent a Trefoil slipped Vert.

Demographics
At the end of 2008 Berikon had 4,491 residents, of whom 591 (13.2%) were non-Swiss, and 50.2% were female. According to the federal census of 2000, the 4358 residents in 1821 households included only 464 foreigners (10.6%).

Over the last 10 years the population has grown at a rate of 0.9%.  Most of the population speaks German (92.6%), with Italian being second most common ( 1.6%) and French being third ( 1.0%).

The age distribution, in Berikon is; 457 children or 10.2% of the population are between 0 and 9 years old and 517 teenagers or 11.5% are between 10 and 19.  Of the adult population, 581 people or 12.9% of the population are between 20 and 29 years old.  651 people or 14.5% are between 30 and 39, 813 people or 18.1% are between 40 and 49, and 650 people or 14.5% are between 50 and 59.  The senior population distribution is 485 people or 10.8% of the population are between 60 and 69 years old, 237 people or 5.3% are between 70 and 79, there are 87 people or 1.9% who are between 80 and 89, and there are 13 people or 0.3% who are 90 and older.

 the average number of residents per living room was 0.56 which is about equal to the cantonal average of 0.57 per room.  In this case, a room is defined as space of a housing unit of at least  as normal bedrooms, dining rooms, living rooms, kitchens and habitable cellars and attics.  About 34.9% of the total households were owner occupied, or in other words did not pay rent (though they may have a mortgage or a rent-to-own agreement).  , there were 127 homes with 1 or 2 persons in the household, 952 homes with 3 or 4 persons in the household, and 684 homes with 5 or more persons in the household.  The average number of people per household was 2.40 individuals.   there were 548 single family homes (or 27.5% of the total) out of a total of 1,993 homes and apartments.  There were a total of 17 empty apartments for a 0.9% vacancy rate.  , the construction rate of new housing units was 0.5 new units per 1000 residents.

The historical population is given in the following table:

Religion

Of the rest of the population, there were 3 individuals (or about 0.07% of the population) who belonged to the Christian Catholic faith.

Administration
The legislative function is exercised by the Gemeindeversammlung or town meeting. The executive in Berikon is handled by a five-member Gemeinderat (town council), the members of which are elected by a plurality voting system for a four-year term. The Gemeinderat leads and represents the village, as well as performing the tasks determined by the Gemeindeversammlung, as well as those delegated by the canton and federal agencies.

Minor legal and civil disagreements fall under the jurisdiction of the Friedensrichterkreis (similar to a Justice of the Peace) of Bremgarten.

In the 2007 federal election the most popular party was the SVP which received 34.2% of the vote.  The next three most popular parties were the SP (18.7%), the CVP (18.1%) and the FDP (14.1%).

Education
In Berikon about 84.7% of the population (between age 25–64) have completed either non-mandatory upper secondary education or additional higher education (either university or a Fachhochschule).  Of the school age population, there are 334 students attending primary school, there are 312 students attending secondary school, there are 284 students attending tertiary or university level schooling in the municipality.

Berikon has primary schools of its own from kindergarten up through intermediate school (Bezirksschule, grades 6 through 9). The nearest Kantonsschule (canton school), a secondary school, is in Wohlen.

Economy

, Berikon had an unemployment rate of 2.46%.  , there were 85 people employed in the primary economic sector and about 22 businesses involved in this sector.  142 people are employed in the secondary sector and there are 33 businesses in this sector.  956 people are employed in the tertiary sector, with 191 businesses in this sector.

 there were 2,504 total workers who lived in the municipality.  Of these, 2,037 or about 81.3% of the residents worked outside Berikon while 644 people commuted into the municipality for work.  There were a total of 1,111 jobs (of at least 6 hours per week) in the municipality.  Of the working population, 19.5% used public transportation to get to work, and 56.9% used a private car.  The majority of the working residents commute to jobs in the city of Zurich or in the towns of the nearby Limmat Valley (Dietikon, Spreitenbach, Schlieren).

Transportation

The Berikon-Widen station of the Bremgarten-Dietikon-Bahn stands right on the Mutschellen pass. This station is a stop of the S-Bahn Zürich on the line S17 serviced by the Bremgarten-Dietikon-Bahn. Buses of two Postauto lines, each with a terminus at Berikon-Widen station, connect the Mutschellen communities with Baden to the north and Zurich at the Wiedikon station to the east. The   No. 350 Postauto line to Zurich Wiedikon also affords a good connection in Birmensdorf with the S9 and S15 train lines to Zurich, Affoltern am Albis,  and Zug.

Before the A1 expressway was built, the Mutschellen pass was the main connection for auto traffic between Zurich and Bern. Now, the road to Bern (Bernstrasse or Hauptstrasse 1) is still an important carrier of road traffic, particularly commuters. With the completion of the A4 expressway (scheduled November 2009) much more traffic (at least 5% by 2015) is expected through Berikon for travellers heading for the interchange at Birmensdorf (approx. 3 km away). Berikon has begun roadwork with a view to reduce the flow of transit vehicles. The project implementing these remedial measures is planned to last some 2.5 years and should be completed in autumn of 2011.

References

External links

 Kanton Aargau: Betriebszählung 2005 Business census 2005 figures
Hauser-Gehrig, Margrith (year unknown). Erinnerungen an Alt Berikon. Publisher unknown. Excerpts accessed via Berikon Web site, 2009-06-27.

Municipalities of Aargau